The Westerly Armory is an historic National Guard armory building located on Railroad Avenue, west of downtown Westerly, Rhode Island.

History
The armory was built in 1901 to replace another destroyed armory.  It was designed by William R. Walker & Son, a firm that designed several other armories and public buildings in Rhode Island during the late 19th and early 20th century.  The building was added to the National Register of Historic Places in the fall of 1996.  The "Armory serves presently as a museum of military and community memorabilia, a social and cultural center for the area, and home to the Westerly Band (oldest civic band in the country) and its historic library."

See also
Cranston Street Armory
Pawtucket Armory
National Register of Historic Places listings in Washington County, Rhode Island

References

External links

The Historic Armories of Rhode Island
Westerly Armory website

Armories in Rhode Island
Westerly, Rhode Island
Buildings and structures in Washington County, Rhode Island
History museums in Rhode Island
Museums in Washington County, Rhode Island
Government buildings completed in 1901
Armories on the National Register of Historic Places in Rhode Island
Military facilities on the National Register of Historic Places in Rhode Island
National Register of Historic Places in Washington County, Rhode Island
Brick buildings and structures
Gothic Revival architecture in Rhode Island